Charles Allen Bigelow (December 12, 1862 – March 12, 1912) was an American actor. Born in Cleveland, Ohio, he became a comedic actor and, though contemporary critics complained of his versatility, he was also one of the most popular comedians of the generation. He performed alongside Anna Held in Florenz Ziegfeld, Jr.'s revival of The French Maid in 1899 and received rave reviews.

In his later career, Bigelow became unreliable and, after suffering a nervous breakdown, he was institutionalized in New York by his wife in December 1910.

Bigelow died in Meadville, Pennsylvania on March 12, 1912, on his way home to New York after visiting Cambridge Springs for his health.

References

External links

 
 

1862 births
1912 deaths
19th-century American male actors
20th-century American male actors
American male stage actors
Male actors from Cleveland